Ellis Taylor (born 14 April 2003) is an English professional footballer who plays as a midfielder for EFL Championship club Sunderland.

Playing career
Taylor played for Seaton Carew before joining the academy at Sunderland at the age of nine following a series of trials. He won two caps for the England U15 squad in December 2017. He signed his first professional contract in June 2021, which would keep him at the Stadium of Light until 2024. Taylor made his first-team debut on 10 August 2021, in a 2–1 win at Port Vale in an EFL Cup first round fixture.

On 28 July 2022, Taylor signed for his hometown club Hartlepool United on a season-long loan. Taylor's loan was cut short on 1 January 2023.

Statistics

References

2003 births
Living people
Footballers from Hartlepool
English footballers
England youth international footballers
Association football midfielders
Sunderland A.F.C. players
Hartlepool United F.C. players
English Football League players